The Bundaberg Grizzlies is a rugby league team from Bundaberg, Queensland that had previously played in the Queensland Cup. Their home ground is Salter Oval, Bundaberg.

History
The Grizzlies were founded in 1996 and played in the Queensland Cup for 3 years (1996–98) and didn't win any premierships.

See also

References

External links

Rugby clubs established in 1996
Defunct rugby league teams in Australia
Rugby league teams in Queensland
Bundaberg
1996 establishments in Australia